Bezmiechowa Dolna  ( or , Bezmihova Dolishnia or Biz’mihova Dolishnia) is a village in the administrative district of Gmina Lesko, within Lesko County, Subcarpathian Voivodeship, in south-eastern Poland.

References

Bezmiechowa Dolna